Pachytriton feii is a species of salamander in the family Salamandridae from the Huangshan Mountains of Anhui, and southeastern Henan, China.

References

feii